Sergei Amanovich Khummedov (born 12 February 1957), better known by the pen name Sergei Aman, is a Russian writer and journalist.

Sergei Aman was born in Mary, in the former Turkmen Soviet Socialist Republic, then part of the Soviet Union. He graduated from Moscow State University in 1985. 
In 1995 Sergei Aman became a journalist of the daily Moskovskij Komsomolets. Also he worked in Vechernyaya Moskva, Stupeni, The New Medical Gazette, magazine Auto M. 
The most famous book of Sergei Aman is Journalists. He published this novel in 2013.
In 2018 Sergei Aman  published the novel Everything Will Be Okay, We're All Going to Die!

Sergei Aman served as a prototype for one of the main characters — Sergei Medov or Amanich, a writer from Russia — in the  thriller  novels The Painter & Eros and Our Wild Sex in Malindi  by Andrei Gusev. 
Sergei Aman is a member of the Union of Russian Writers. He lives in Moscow. His hobby is sport fishing from a boat.

References

External links

 Official website of Sergei Aman 
 Sergei Aman in Facebook

1957 births
Living people
People from Mary, Turkmenistan 
Writers from Moscow
Russian male novelists
21st-century Russian novelists
Moscow State University alumni
21st-century Russian journalists
20th-century Russian journalists
Russian male journalists